This is a list of diplomatic missions in Rwanda. The capital Kigali currently hosts 37 embassies and high commissions.

Diplomatic missions in Kigali

Embassies and High Commissions 
Entries marked with an asterisk (*) are member-states of the Commonwealth of Nations. As such, their embassies are formally termed as "high commissions".

 
*

*

*

* 

*

*

*
 
*

Other missions or delegations 
 (Office of the High Commission)
 (Delegation)
 (Cooperation office & consular agency)

Non-resident embassies accredited to Rwanda

Resident in Addis Ababa, Ethiopia

Resident in Dar es Salaam, Tanzania

Resident in Kampala, Uganda

Resident in Kinshasa, Congo-Kinshasa

Resident in Nairobi, Kenya

Resident in Pretoria, South Africa

Resident in other cities

 (Doha)
 (Brazzaville)
 (Doha)
 (Brazzaville)
 (Khartoum)
 (Singapore)
 (Maputo)

See also 
 Foreign relations of Rwanda
 List of diplomatic missions of Rwanda
 Visa requirements for Rwandan citizens

References

External links
 Ministry of foreign affairs of Rwanda

Diplomatic missions
Rwanda
Diplomatic missions